Kangarlu (also Romanized as Kangarlū and Kangarloo) is a village in Lakestan Rural District, in the Central District of Salmas County, West Azerbaijan Province, Iran. At the 2006 census, its population was 1,247, in 298 families.

References 

Populated places in Salmas County